State Highway 86 (SH 86) is a New Zealand state highway connecting the city of Dunedin's airport to  and the city itself. It was gazetted in 2003. It is a two-lane single carriageway.

Route 
The road begins at an intersection with SH 1 in the satellite town of Allanton and proceeds in a north-northwesterly direction over the Taieri Plains. After about 1.5 km the road curves to the west-southwest and proceeds for about 3.5 km before veering to the NNW and then to the SSW again at Momona before terminating at Dunedin airport.

See also
List of New Zealand state highways

References

External links
 New Zealand Transport Agency

86
Transport in Dunedin
Transport in Otago